Angel on My Shoulder is a 1946 American fantasy film directed by Archie Mayo (his last film) and starring Paul Muni, Anne Baxter and Claude Rains. The plot involves a deal between the devil and a dead man.

The film was an independent production produced by Charles R. Rogers and David W. Siegel, written by Harry Segall and Roland Kibbee and released by United Artists.

The producer changed the original title of Me and Satan, concerned that the public would not see a film about the devil.

Plot

After his release from prison, gangster Eddie Kagle is killed by his partner in crime, Smiley Williams. Kagle ends up in Hell, where "Nick" offers him a chance to leave and avenge his own death in exchange for help with a problem. Kagle looks exactly like Judge Frederick Parker, an upright man who is causing Nick distress because he is too honest. Nick fears that Parker may cause him more anxiety in future, as he is running for governor of his state. Nick wants to destroy Parker's reputation and Kagle readily agrees to have his soul transferred into Parker's body.

As soon as Kagle appears as Parker, odd things begin to happen. Kagle pursues his goal with evil intent (though often at cross purposes with the devil), but everything he does to ruin Judge Parker's reputation somehow results in making Parker look better. Along the way, Kagle falls in love with Barbara Foster, the judge's fiancée, causing him to question his whole outlook on life and to eventually rebel against Nick.

Nick presents Kagle with the opportunity to shoot Williams, but instead Kagle confronts Williams with the truth. Shocked and frightened, Williams backs away and falls out of an open window to his death. Beyond Nick's power by virtue of having committed no wrongdoing since his return to life, Kagle is eager to stay, start a life with Barbara and take up Judge Parker's mission to support troubled young people. However, Nick tells him that every moment Kagle is present he is denying Parker and Barbara their rightful life together. Kagle agrees, bids Barbara farewell and relinquishes Parker's body, allowing the couple a tearful reunion.

Exasperated and defeated, Nick takes Kagle back to Hell, leaving Judge Parker in a much better position than before. Nick threatens to make the reformed Kagle's punishment even more painful than usual, but Kagle blackmails him; in return for not revealing Nick's blunders, Kagle wants to be made a trustee. Nick has no option but to agree to the demand.

Cast

Copyright status and remakes
The film is now in the public domain in the United States because the producers neglected to renew the copyright in 1973.

The film was remade for television, directed by John Berry and starring Peter Strauss, Richard Kiley and Barbara Hershey. It premiered on ABC on May 11, 1980.

References

External links

 
 
 
 
 
 

1946 films
1946 fantasy films
American fantasy films
1940s English-language films
American black-and-white films
Films scored by Dimitri Tiomkin
Films directed by Archie Mayo
Films about the afterlife
United Artists films
1940s American films